The National Industrial Technology Institute, commonly known as INTI, is an Argentine federal agency in charge of the developing of Industrial technology.

It was created in 1957.

See also 
 INTA, National Agricultural Technology Institute of Argentina

External links
Science and Education in Argentina
Official website

Scientific organisations based in Argentina
Government agencies of Argentina